James Wright Gordon (1809 – December 1853), usually referred to as J. Wright Gordon, was a Whig politician from the U.S. state of Michigan.

Life and politics in Michigan
Gordon was born in Plainfield, Connecticut and studied law at Harvard University. He was a descendant of Edmond Gordon the immigrant, who arrived from England in 1635 as part of the Puritan migration to New England.

He later moved to Michigan, establishing a practice in Marshall, and also lived for a time in Battle Creek.  He was a member of the Michigan State Senate (6th district) in 1839 and served as the second lieutenant governor of Michigan from 1840 to 1841.

Gordon became the third governor of Michigan ex officio, when William Woodbridge resigned on February 23, 1841, to become a U.S. Senator. He completed the remainder of Woodbridge's term, until January 3, 1842.

He ran unsuccessfully for U.S. Representative from Michigan's 2nd congressional district in 1846 and 1847, being defeated by John Smith Chipman.

Death in Brazil
Gordon was at the U.S. Consul in Pernambuco, Brazil from 1850 to 1853 and died at the age of 44, while in office, when he accidentally fell to his death from a second-story balcony. He is buried in Brazil.

References

 The Political Graveyard

1809 births
1853 deaths
Accidental deaths in Brazil
Accidental deaths from falls
American consuls
People from Plainfield, Connecticut
Michigan Whigs
Whig Party state governors of the United States
19th-century American politicians
Governors of Michigan
Lieutenant Governors of Michigan
Michigan state senators
19th-century American diplomats